A penumbral lunar eclipse took place on Wednesday, May 4, 1966, the first of two penumbral lunar eclipses in 1966. It was visible from South America, Europe, Africa, Asia, Australia and Antarctica.

Visibility
The penumbral eclipse was visible in South America, Europe, Africa, central Asia and Australia, seen rising over North Atlantic Ocean and South America and setting over Australia, South China Sea and East China Sea as of today.

Related lunar eclipses

Lunar year series

Saros series 

Lunar Saros 111, repeating every 18 years and 11 days, has a total of 71 lunar eclipse events including 11 total lunar eclipses. The first total lunar eclipse of this series was on April 19, 1353, and last was on August 4, 1533. The longest occurrence of this series was on June 12, 1443 when the totality lasted 106 minutes.

Metonic series

Half-Saros cycle
A lunar eclipse will be preceded and followed by solar eclipses by 9 years and 5.5 days (a half saros). This lunar eclipse is related to two solar eclipses of Solar Saros 118.

See also
List of lunar eclipses
List of 20th-century lunar eclipses

Notes

External links

1966-05
1966 in science